Six Celan Songs • The Ballad of Kastriot Rexhepi is the 54th album released by Michael Nyman, who composed and conducted both the works on the album. The first, a setting of poetry by Paul Celan, was originally recorded by Ute Lemper and the Michael Nyman Band on The Michael Nyman Songbook in 1991, and here the band is joined by Hilary Summers. The Ballad of Kastriot Rexhepi is a new work created with the artist Mary Kelly. This is performed by the soprano Sarah Leonard with The Nyman Quartet: Gabrielle Lester, Catherine Thompson, Kate Musker and Tony Hinnigan.

Track listing
Chanson einer Dame im Schatten – 7.11 
Es war Erde in ihnen – 4.57 
Psalm – 3.42 
Corona – 7.09 
Nächtlich geschürzt – 6.47 
Blume – 6.08
The Ballad of Kastriot Rexhepi - 17:43

Personnel
Michael Nyman, conductor
Gabrielle Lester, violin
Catherine Thompson, violin
Kate Musker, viola
Tony Hinnigan, cello
Nick Cooper, cello
Chris Laurence, double bass
Martin Elliott, bass guitar
David Roach, soprano and alto saxophones
Simon Haram, soprano and alto saxophones
Robert Buckland, soprano and alto saxophones
Andrew Findo[n], baritone saxophone, flute, piccolo
Andrew Sparling, bass clarinet
Steve Sidwell, trumpet
Nigel Barr, bass trombone, euphonium
David Arch, piano
Hilary Summers, contralto
Sarah Leonard, soprano
Produced by Michael Nyman
Recorded, mixed and edited by Austin Ince
Assistant engineer (Six Celan Songs): James Stone
Assistant engineer (The Ballad of Kastriot Rexhepi): Matthew Bartram
Mixed at Abbey Road Studios 26 and 27 March 2006
Assistant engineer: Robert Houston
Mastered by Peter Mew at Abbey Road Studios
Published by Chester Music Ltd 1991/2001
Thanks to Ute Lamper, Volker Schlöndorff, Declan Colgan, Elsa Longhauser, Mary Kelly, The Photographers, Colette Barber at Abbey Road Studios, Viviana D'Ambrosio, Nigel Barr, Jane Carter
Design by Russell Mills (shed) 
Co-design by Michael Webster (storm) 
Cover photography by Michael Nyman
Liner notes: Michael Nyman, Michael Hamburger, Mary Kelly, Elsa Longhauser
Celan translations: Michael Hamburger

External links
Mary Kelly

2006 albums
Michael Nyman albums